Thakhli is the southernmost district (amphoe) of Nakhon Sawan province, Thailand.

History

The name of the district originates from the Tikhli (polo) ground in Sang Thong (สังข์ทอง), the royal novel of King Rama II. Sang Thong is a novel adapted from Takhli's folklore, that makes it present streets and utilities of the district are named according to the characters in the story.

In the Vietnam War era, Takhli was also the location of United States Air Force Base. Up until now, it is also the location of the Takhli Royal Thai Air Force Base of the Royal Thai Air Force (RTAF).

From the US Air Force setting up a base at that time. As a result, Takhli has become a red-light district for service to the G.I., especially in Ban Takhli railway station area there are many pubs, bars and sporting houses, make this quarter known locally as Thanon Daeng (ถนนแดง, "red street"). These prostitutes were not all local girls, some of them come from nearby areas such as Taphan Hin, Bang Mun Nak, Thap Khlo, Chum Saeng, Thap Krit etc. Nowadays, they have long become desolate places.

Geography
Neighbouring districts are (from the north clockwise): Phayuha Khiri and Tak Fa of Nakhon Sawan; Nong Muang and Ban Mi of Lopburi province; In Buri of Singburi province; and Sapphaya, Mueang Chai Nat, and Manorom of Chai Nat province.

Administration
The district is divided into 11 sub-districts (tambons), which are further subdivided into 128 villages (mubans). Takhli itself has town status (thesaban mueang) and covers part of tambon Takhli. Chong Khae is a township (thesaban tambon) and covers parts of tambons Chong Khae and Phrom Nimit. There are a further 10 tambon administrative organizations (TAO).

References

External links
amphoe.com

Takhli